Jacques Sternberg (April 17, 1923, Antwerp, Belgium – October 11, 2006, Paris) was a French-language writer of science fiction and
fantastique.

Biography
Sternberg was born to a well-to-do Russian-Jewish family. He was a poor student in school, particularly struggling in French. He began writing around the age of fifteen or sixteen. His early writings tended toward the fantastic and the burlesque, and it was only somewhat later that he began writing science fiction.

After school Sternberg worked as a packer in a cardboard factory, before moving to Paris with the hope of becoming a publishing writer. The literary climate of 1950s Paris was dominated by the Surrealists and Sternberg found some success in that environment.  Sternberg never identified with either his Jewish or Belgian heritage preferring to think of himself as simply "mortal."

In his writings Sternberg never wrote of either the rich or the poor, but only of the employee, which represented the only world which he knew and could imagine. (source: Lamediatheque.be)

Sternberg, a very apt helmsman, owned a diminutive 12 Ft dinghy (Zef class, excellent for day cruising but slow and utterly unfit for racing) and often undertook arduous coastal treks, even in comparatively bad weather. An anarchist at heart, he rejected organized regatta and racing – Not unlike Bernard Moitessier, the famous ocean vagabond – and wrote a biting satire of yachtsmen, sponsors and yacht clubs, in his erotic-nautical novel Le navigateur published at the peak of Eric Tabarly's success. Dinghy sailing means living a very close relationship with the sea and it is one of the keys to understand the important place of the sea in Sternberg's work, specially in what may arguably be his best novel Sophie, la mer et la nuit.

Sternberg died from lung cancer, aged 83.

Overview
Jacques Sternberg straddled the line between the fantastique and science fiction, which he stated was only a subset of the former in a notorious essay, Une Succursale du Fantastique nommée Science-Fiction [A Branch of the Fantastic Called Science Fiction], published in 1958.

In Sternberg's works, the causes of terror are not ghosts or vampires but the modern-day city, often depicted as a giant, evil entity, ready to crush the hapless humans who dare live within its body.  This theme reappears in novels such as L'Employé [The Employee] (1958), L'Architecte [The Architect] (1960) and La Banlieue [The Suburb] (1976).

Sternberg's short stories, collected in La Géométrie dans l'Impossible [The Impossible Geometry] (1953), La Géométrie dans la Terreur [The Terror Geometry] (1958), Contes Glacés [Icy Tales] (1974) and Contes Griffus [Clawed Tales] (1993), to name but a few, successfully mix several diverse elements: a very dark sense of  Surreal humor, a kafkaesque notion of the absurd, a taste for the macabre, and finally, a somber, pessimistic vision of the world and the future.  In Sternberg's fiction, love is never a source of redemption, but something impossible, almost alien, as in Sophie, la Mer, la Nuit [Sophie, The Sea, The Night] (1976) and Le Navigateur [The Navigator] (1977).

Sternberg's science fiction stories followed the same absurdist tradition and were gathered in various collections such as Entre Deux Mondes Incertains [Between Two Uncertain Worlds] (1957), Univers Zéro [Universe Zero] (1970) and Futurs sans Avenir [Future Without Future] (1971). Themes included aliens misguidedly posing as African-Americans to invade America, the 533rd crucifixion of Jesus, the casual destruction of Earth by aliens who cannot understand humanity, etc. Sternberg's stories anticipate the experimental texts of the New Wave and the humor of Douglas Adams.

Sternberg's novels exhibit the same dark, misanthropic characteristics: La Sortie est au Fond de l'Espace [The Exit Lies at the End of Space] (1956) (with a touch of humor) or Attention, Planète Habitée [Beware, Inhabited Planet] (1969) (minus the humor) follows the same, merciless logic.

Sternberg also wrote for film director Alain Resnais, penning the script of his 1968 surreal time travel feature, Je t'aime, Je t'aime.

Selected bibliography
 La Géométrie dans l'Impossible [The Impossible Geometry] (1953)
 Le Délit [The Infraction] (1954)
 La Sortie est au Fond de l'Espace [The Exit Lies at the End of Space] (1956)
 Entre Deux Mondes Incertains [Between Two Uncertain Worlds] (1957)
 La Géométrie dans la Terreur [The Terror Geometry] (1958)
 L'Employé [The Employee] (1958)
 L'Architecte [The Architect] (1960)
 Manuel du Parfait Secrétaire Commercial [Handbook of the Perfect Commercial Secretary] (1960)
 La Banlieue [The Suburbs] (1961)
 Un Jour Ouvrable [A Working Day] (1961)
 Toi, Ma Nuit [You, My Night] (1965; transl. as Sexualis '95, 1967)
 C'est la Guerre, Mr. Gruber [It's War, Mr. Gruber] (1968)
 Attention, Planète Habitée [Beware, Inhabited Planet] (1969)
 Je t'aime, Je t'aime [I Love You, I Love You] (1969)
 Univers Zéro [Universe Zero] (1970)
 Le Coeur Froid [The Cold Heart] (1971)
 Dictionnaire du Diable The Devil's Dictionary (1973)
 Futurs sans Avenir (1971; transl. as Future Without Future, 1974)
 Contes Glacés [Icy Tales] (1974)
 Lettre Ouverte aux Terriens [Open Letter to The Earthmen]1974)
 Sophie, la Mer, la Nuit [Sophie, The Sea, The Night] (1976)
 La Banlieue [The Suburb] (1976)
 Vivre en Survivant [To Live As A Survivor] (1977)
 Le Navigateur [The Navigator] (1977)
 Mai 86 (1978)
 Kriss l'Emballeur [Kriss The Packer] (1979)
 Suite pour Evelyne Sweet Evelyne [Suite for Evelyne Sweet Evelyne] (1980)
 Le Supplice des Week-Ends [The Torture of Week-Ends] (1981)
 L'Anonyme [The Anonymous] (1982)
 Dictionnaire des Idées Revues [Dictionary of Reviewed Ideas] (1985)
 188 Contes à Régler [188 Tales on Account] (1988)
 Histoires à Dormir sans Vous [Stories to Sleep Without You] (1990)
 Histoire à Mourir de Vous [Story to Die of You] (1991)
 Contes Griffus [Clawed Tales] (1993)
 Dieu, Moi et les Autres [God, I And Others] (1995)

References

External links
 (in french) Jacques Sternberg en Solitaire

1923 births
2006 deaths
Writers from Antwerp
Belgian Jews
French science fiction writers
French fantasy writers
Deaths from lung cancer in France
French male novelists
20th-century French novelists
20th-century French male writers
Belgian emigrants to France